Helen Westley (born Henrietta Remsen Meserole Manney; March 28, 1875 – December 12, 1942) was an American character actress of stage and screen

Early years

Westley was born Henrietta Remsen Meserole Manney in Brooklyn, New York on March 28, 1875. She attended the American Academy of Dramatic Arts.

Career 
Westley's early career activities included performing in stock theater and in vaudeville around the United States. Her New York stage debut came on September 13, 1897, when she portrayed Angelina McKeagey in The Captain of the Nonesuch.

Westley was an organizer of the Washington Square Players, debuting with that group on February 19, 1915, as the Oyster in Another Interior. She was a founding member of the original board of the Theatre Guild, and appeared in many of its productions, among them Peer Gynt, and some of their productions of plays by George Bernard Shaw— Caesar and Cleopatra, Pygmalion, Heartbreak House, Major Barbara, The Doctor's Dilemma and The Apple Cart. She appeared in the original Broadway productions of two plays which, after her death, turned into classic Rodgers and Hammerstein musicals: Green Grow the Lilacs, which became Oklahoma!, and Liliom, which became Carousel. Westley played Aunt Eller in the former and Mrs. Muskat (who became Mrs. Mullin in Carousel) in the latter. She appeared in the original Broadway production of Eugene O'Neill's Strange Interlude.

Westley played roles, both comic and dramatic, in many films. They included Death Takes a Holiday, All This and Heaven Too, four films opposite child star Shirley Temple (including Dimples and Heidi), the 1934 surprise hit Anne of Green Gables,  the 1935 film version of Roberta, and the 1936 film version of Show Boat, in which she replaced Edna May Oliver, when Oliver declined to repeat her stage role as Parthy Ann Hawks. She appeared in Rebecca of Sunnybrook Farm in 1938 with Shirley Temple and Randolph Scott as Aunt Miranda. In 1936, she played in Banjo on My Knee with Barbara Stanwyck, Walter Brennan and Buddy Ebsen.

Westley's final film was My Favorite Spy.

Personal life and death
Westley married John Westley, a Broadway actor, on October 31, 1900. The couple separated in 1912, with the marriage ending in divorce. The couple had one daughter, Ethel.

Westley retired from acting in 1942, and subsequently lived with Ethel at her daughter's home in Middlebush, New Jersey, until Westley's death from an undisclosed illness on December 12, 1942. She was cremated at the Rose Hill Cemetery in Linden, New Jersey. On December 17 of the same year, Ethel had her mother's ashes buried at Cypress Hills Cemetery in Brooklyn, New York, in Section 9, Lot 26 (the same site where Westley's mother and father were buried).

Partial  filmography

Moulin Rouge (1934) - Mrs. Morris
The House of Rothschild (1934) - Gudula Rothschild
Looking for Trouble (1934) - Pearl's Landlady (uncredited)
Death Takes a Holiday (1934) - Stephanie
The Age of Innocence (1934) - Granny Mingott
Anne of Green Gables (1934) - Marilla Cuthbert
Captain Hurricane (1935) - Abbie Howland
Roberta (1935) - Aunt Minnie aka Roberta
Chasing Yesterday (1935) - Therese
The Melody Lingers On (1935) - Franceska Manzoni
Splendor (1935) - Mrs. Emmeline Lorrimore
Show Boat (1936) - Parthenia "Parthy" Ann Hawks
Half Angel (1936) - Mrs. Martha Hargraves
Dimples (1936) - Mrs. Caroline Drew
Banjo on My Knee (1936) - Grandma
Stowaway (1936) - Mrs. Hope
Café Metropole (1937) - Margaret Ridgeway
Sing and Be Happy (1937) - Mrs. Henty
Heidi (1937) - Blind Anna
I'll Take Romance (1937) - Madame Della aka Madella
She Married an Artist (1937) - Martha Moriarty
The Baroness and the Butler (1938) - Countess Sandor
Rebecca of Sunnybrook Farm (1938) - Aunt Miranda Wilkins
Alexander's Ragtime Band (1938) - Aunt Sophie
Keep Smiling (1938) - Mrs. Willoughby
Zaza (1938) - Anais
Wife, Husband and Friend (1939) - Mrs. Blair
Lillian Russell (1940) - Grandma Leonard
The Captain Is a Lady (1940) - Abigail Morrow
All This, and Heaven Too (1940) - Madame LeMaire
Lady with Red Hair (1940) - Mrs. Frazier
Adam Had Four Sons (1941) - Cousin Philippa
Lady from Louisiana (1941) - Blanche Brunot
Sunny (1941) - Aunt Barbara
Million Dollar Baby (1941) - Mrs. Galloway
The Smiling Ghost (1941) - Grandmother Bentley
Bedtime Story (1941) - Emma Harper
My Favorite Spy (1942) - Aunt Jessie (final film role)

References

External links

Helen Westley portrait NYP Library
  portrait of Helen Westley(corbis)
dress portrait(University of Washington, Sayre collection)

1875 births
1942 deaths
Actresses from New York (state)
American film actresses
American musical theatre actresses
American stage actresses
Musicians from Brooklyn
People from Franklin Township, Somerset County, New Jersey
20th-century American actresses
19th-century American actresses